An appellation is a legally defined and protected geographical indication primarily used to identify where the grapes for a wine were grown, although other types of food often have appellations as well.  Restrictions other than geographical boundaries, such as what grapes may be grown, maximum grape yields, alcohol level, and other quality factors may also apply before an appellation name may legally appear on a wine bottle label. The rules that govern appellations are dependent on the country in which the wine was produced.

History
The tradition of wine appellation is very old. The oldest references are to be found in the Bible, where wine of Samaria, wine of Carmel, wine of Jezreel, or wine of Helbon are mentioned. This tradition of appellation continued throughout the Antiquity and the Middle Ages, though without any officially sanctioned rules. Historically, the world's first exclusive (protected) vineyard zone was introduced in Chianti, Italy in 1716 and the first wine classification system in Tokaj-Hegyalja, Hungary, in 1730.

Europe

France
In 1935, the Institut National des Appellations d'Origine (INAO), a branch of the French Ministry of Agriculture, was created to manage wine-processing in France.  In the Rhone wine region Baron Pierre Le Roy Boiseaumarié, a lawyer and winegrower from Châteauneuf-du-Pape, obtained legal recognition of the Côtes du Rhône appellation of origin in 1937. The AOC seal, or Appellation d'Origine Contrôlée, was created and mandated by French laws in the 1950s, 1960s, and 1970s.

Before 1935, despite the fact that the INAO was yet to be created, champagne enjoyed an appellation control by virtue of legal protection as part of the Treaty of Madrid.  The treaty stated that only sparkling wine produced in Champagne and adhering to the standards defined for that name as an Appellation d'Origine Contrôlée could be called champagne. This right was reaffirmed in the Treaty of Versailles after World War I.

Germany
Germany is unusual among wine-producing countries in that its most prestigious classifications, the various grades of Prädikatswein, are based on the ripeness of the grapes, though their geographical origins are also legally defined.  Thus Germany's geographical classification, Qualitätswein bestimmter Anbaugebiete (QbA), is akin to France's defunct  Vin Délimité de Qualité Superieure, which has been subsumed into the current Appellation d'Origine Contrôlée system.

Georgia
Georgia has 24 registered wine appellations.

Hungary
Historically, the world's first vineyard classification system was introduced in Tokaj-Hegyalja, Hungary, in 1730.
Vineyards were classified into three categories depending on the soil, sun exposure, and potential to develop Botrytis cinerea. The subdivisions were: first-class, second-class and third-class wines.  A decree by the Habsburg crown in 1757 established a closed production district in Tokaj.  The classification system was completed by the national censuses of 1765 and 1772.

Italy
Italy's first origin classification system was introduced in Tuscany in 1716 for delimiting Chianti production. After the unification of Italy several attempts were made to introduce some kind of protection for wine appellations, to no avail. Only in 1963 the "Denominazione di origine controllata" law was approved, starting with 1967 vintage.

Portugal
The world's third-oldest appellation control, after Chianti and Tokaj, was introduced in Portugal in 1756, pertaining to port wine, which was produced in the region of the Douro valley.

Spain
Some Spanish wines were already famous or even regulated (Rioja: 1925; Sherry: 1933) when the market started being regulated. It was not until 1980 that legislation on denominación de origen was stablished, following the French scheme with more tiers of classification and prompted by the impending accession to the European Union.

North America

Canada

Canadian wine appellations are regulated by the Vintners Quality Alliance system. The system covers the provinces of British Columbia and Ontario.

British Columbia is divided into four "Designated Viticultural Areas" ("DVAs"): Okanagan Valley, Vancouver Island, Fraser Valley, and the Similkameen Valley. Ontario includes three DVAs: Niagara Peninsula, Lake Erie North Shore, and Prince Edward County.

On June 11, 2012, Nova Scotia launched its first appellation,  Tidal Bay.

United States

The American Viticultural Area ("AVA") is for the United States. The only requirement to use an AVA name on the wine label is that 85% of the wine must have come from grapes grown within the geographical AVA boundaries. The first AVA was in Augusta, Missouri, in June 1980. The approval of the Augusta AVA was based largely on its long historical relationship with wine in the United States.  The Augusta wine-growing area is a  plot of land along the Missouri River, which moderates temperature and provides an appropriate climate for growing grapes.

States or counties can also be used in lieu of an AVA to designate the origin of a wine, provided that 75% of the grapes used in the wine are grown in the state or county listed on the label.

List of appellations

  European Union: Protected Designation of Origin
  Austria: Districtus Austriae Controllatus
  Cyprus:  Ελεγχόμενη Ονομασία Προέλευσης 
  France: Appellation d'origine contrôlée
  Germany: German wine classification
  Greece: ονομασία προελεύσεως ελεγχομένη
  Italy: Denominazione di Origine Controllata
  Luxembourg: Appellation contrôlée
  Portugal: Denominação de Origem Controlada
  Romania: Denumire de Origine Controlată
  Spain: Denominación de origen protegida
  Switzerland: Appellation d'origine contrôlée
  Australia: Australian Geographical Indications
  Argentina: Denominación de origen - see also:Argentine wine
  Canada: Vintners Quality Alliance
  Brazil: Denominação de Origem
  Chile: see Chilean wine
  South Africa: Wine of Origin
  United Kingdom: Protected Denomination of Origin
  United States: American Viticultural Area

See also
 Protected Designation of Origin
 Terroir

Notes and references

External links

Appellation America Wine Portal. Information about recognized wine appellations in the United States and Canada.

 
Wine terminology